William Perry Crowell (born November 26, 1940) was Deputy Director of the National Security Agency from February 1994 to September 1997, during which time he was the highest ranking civilian in the agency, who oversaw management.

Career
Crowell joined as an agency recruiter for the NSA in 1962, Crowell was also Deputy Director for Operations of the agency from October 1991 to February 1994. He has also served on many boards and as president of private sector intelligence and security companies, including CEO of Cylink Corporation, and as director at Broadware Technologies, Prominex, ArcSight, Inc., Narus, SafeNet, Inc., DRS Technologies, Inc., AirPatrol as well as on the SunFed Board of Directors.
He retired from the NSA on September 12, 1997.

References

1940 births
Living people
Deputy Directors of the National Security Agency
People from Louisiana